Saffa Riffat is President of the World Society of Sustainable Energy Technology, Chair in Sustainable Energy Technology at the University of Nottingham and the head of Nottingham's Architecture, Climate and Environment Group. He is the editor-in-chief of the International Journal of Low-Carbon Technologies, published by Oxford University Press. In 2018, he was elected to the European Academy of Sciences.

Early life and education
Saffa Riffat was born on 1 July 1954. He was educated at Keble College in Oxford University and earned a Doctor of Philosophy degree in 1986 and Doctor of Science in 1997.

References

External links
WSSET: "World Society of Sustainable Energy Technologies"
SET 2016:"The 15th International Conference on Sustainable Energy Technologies"; Singapore.
SET 2017:"The 16th International Conference on Sustainable Energy Technologies"; Bologna, Italy on 17 –20 July 2017.

Living people
1954 births
Alumni of the University of Oxford